The Castor-Orbus was a Castor 4 sounding rocket (research rocket designed to take measurements and perform scientific experiments during its flight) that was developed in 1992 by the Orbital Sciences Corporation (OSC) (United States). Launched three times in its five-year-long career from 1992 to 1997, the Castor-Orbus rocket  launched successfully only once. It was first launched on October 16, 1992, while its final launch took place on October 4, 1997.

There were two Castor-Orbus models made, Castor-Orbus and Castor-Orbus 1.

Advanced details 
Weighing 13.5 tons (13,500 kilograms), the Castor-Orbus had a lift-off thrust of approximately 430 kilonewtons (equivalent to around 96,660 lbf). The rocket had a core diameter measuring 1.02 metres (3.34 feet), with a total length of exactly 16 metres (52 ft). The family of the Castor-Orbus rocket was Castor 4, which was partially responsible for the Castor-Orbus naming.

Career 
The Castor-Orbus rocket was launched three times over almost five years. After the launch of October 4, 1997, the Castor-Orbus was dropped from service.

The first launch of the Castor-Orbus took place on October 16, 1992, at around 6:30 am. The location of the launch was Wake Island, in the North Pacific Ocean. This launch proved to be a failure.
The second launch took place almost five years later, on February 10, 1997, at the Nevada Test Site, in Nevada, US. This launch would prove to be the first and last successful launch of the Castor-Orbis.
The final launch of the Castor-Orbus was not successful. It took place on October 4, 1997, at the Nevada Test Site.

See also 
List of rockets

References 
Encyclopedia Astronautica
McDowell, Jonathan. Jonathan's Space Home Page, Harvard University, 1997-present

Sounding rockets of the United States